Brian Retterer (born 1972) is a retired American swimmer specialising in freestyle and backstroke events. He swam under Skip Kenney and Ted Knapp while at Stanford, and prior swam at Reno Aquatic Club in Sparks, Nevada.

He is best known for 15 NCAA titles while swimming at Stanford University, most all time for swimming.  He is 1 of 2 swimmers in NCAA history that have won a national title in all 5 relays (Shawn Jordan is the other). He was the high point scorer at NCAA his Junior & Senior year, and was 2nd his sophomore year. He was part of Stanford's recruiting class which was the greatest in swimming history, with Derek Weatherford, Tyler Mayfield, Eddie Parenti, Trip Zedlitz, Bill Schell, & Bob Eastlack.

He was the first person ever to break 46 seconds in the 100yd backstroke and at one time held 7 of the 10 fastest times ever in that event.  The 200 Back record stood for 8 years until broken by Aaron Peirsol in 2003.  He set the National Age Group record in the 17–18 in the 100 & 200 yard backstroke (when swimmers were required to touch the wall with their hands prior to a turn).  He was part of Stanford 1992, 93, 94 NCAA championships teams. He set the American Record & US Open record in the 100yd & 200yd backstroke numerous times from 1992 to 1995.  He also had the fastest 50yd free split ever (18.56) which stood for nearly 14 years.

Brian was inducted into Stanford University Hall of Fame.

International competition he did well also.  He won a silver medal at the 1993 Pan Pacific Swimming Championships in Kobe, Japan, in 1994 he won a gold medal in the 400 Medley relay at World Championships in Rome, Italy, in 1995 finished 9th place at the 1995 Pan Pacific Swimming Championships in Atlanta, GA, in 1996 finished 3rd at the US Olympic Trials, in 1997 won a silver medal in the men's 100m backstroke event at the Short Course World Championships in Gothenburg, Sweden.

His career was mostly likely cut short due to nagging shoulder problems which forced him to red-shirt during college and have major surgery just before the Olympic Trials in 1996.

References 

 

1972 births
Living people
American male swimmers
Stanford Cardinal men's swimmers
Medalists at the FINA World Swimming Championships (25 m)